The Folklorist is a half-hour television series produced by NewTV, a community access television station located in Newton, Massachusetts. The series explores some of the unique and lesser-known stories throughout history. Each half-hour episode of the show contains three or four featured segments that go into the backstory and lasting effects of a particular topic of folklore or hidden history.

History 
In 2011, John Horrigan and the NewTV staff met to discuss the idea of creating a television program about folklore. The NewTV team filmed several segments and a pilot came together within the following months. After the pilot aired in March 2012, the public response was strong enough to continue producing more episodes. Andrew Eldridge and Angela Harrer joined the show as co-producers in 2012 and started working on the show's first season, which aired in 2013. The Folklorist is currently in its second season of production, and is available online, as well on Luken Communication's Family Channel, and is currently available through Comcast's and RCN's on-demand services in the New England region.

Awards 
 2016 Winner of the Boston/New England Emmy Award for Outstanding Director Post Production
 2016 Winner of the Boston/New England Emmy Award for Outstanding Cinematography Short Form
 2015 Winner of the Boston/New England Emmy Award for Outstanding Writing
 2015 Winner of the Boston/New England Emmy Award for Outstanding Editing
 2015 Winner of the Boston/New England Emmy Award for Outstanding Director/Post Production
 2015 Winner of the Boston/New England Emmy Award for Outstanding Performer/Narrator
 2015 Winner of the Alliance for Community Media Hometown Award for Entertainment & Arts Series
 2014 Winner of the Boston/New England Emmy Award for Outstanding Historical Program
 2013 Winner of the Boston/New England Emmy Award for Outstanding Program Host/Moderator
 2013 Winner of the ACM Northeast Video Festival for Best Historical and Cultural Program
 2012 Winner of the Boston/New England Emmy Award for Best Single Spot Promotion

Episodes

References

External links 
http://thefolklorist.newtv.org

American public access television shows
2012 American television series debuts